Danny Sidak is a Bangladeshi film actor and director. He played the role of Superman in the Bangladeshi adaptation of the 1978 film Superman.

Career 
Sidak started his acting career in 1984, in the Shahidul Islam Khokan-directed movie Loraku. He is the vice president of the Bangladesh Awami League-backed cultural organisation, Bongabondhu Sangskritik Jote. He worked with Arifin Shuvo and Mahiya Mahi in the 2014 movie Agnee. In 2015, he acted in the Delwar Jahan Jhantu film Epar Opar with stars Bappy Chowdhury and Achol and in 2016 he acted in Iftakar Chowdhury's film One Way, starring Bappy Chowdhury, and Bobby.

Films

References 

Bangladeshi male film actors
Living people
Year of birth missing (living people)